Bret E. Erickson (born September 26, 1960, in Blair, Nebraska) is an American sport shooter who competed in the 1992 Summer Olympics, in the 1996 Summer Olympics, in the 2004 Summer Olympics, and in the 2008 Summer Olympics.

References

External links
 

1960 births
Living people
American male sport shooters
United States Distinguished Marksman
Trap and double trap shooters
Olympic shooters of the United States
Shooters at the 1992 Summer Olympics
Shooters at the 1996 Summer Olympics
Shooters at the 2004 Summer Olympics
Shooters at the 2008 Summer Olympics
People from Blair, Nebraska
Sportspeople from Nebraska
Pan American Games medalists in shooting
Pan American Games silver medalists for the United States
Shooters at the 2007 Pan American Games
Medalists at the 2007 Pan American Games
20th-century American people
21st-century American people